Šajdíkové Humence is a village and municipality in Senica District in the Trnava Region of western Slovakia.

History
In historical records the village was first mentioned in 1926.

Geography
The municipality lies at an altitude of 195 metres and covers an area of 15.524 km². It has a population of about 1115 people.

References

External links

 Official page
http://www.statistics.sk/mosmis/eng/run.html

Villages and municipalities in Senica District